The Prince or Princess of Girona is a title that was historically accorded to the heir apparent or heir presumptive to the Crown of Aragon. Current legislation mandates the title of Prince of Asturias to the heir of the Spanish throne but allows for the use of other traditional titles; the current title-holder, therefore, is Leonor, Princess of Girona.

Origin of the title
It originated in 1351 when King Peter IV of Aragon named his successor, to whom he conceded the title of Duke of Girona; the title embraced territories of the counties of Girona, Besalú, Empúries and Ausona.

In part I of the Constitucions i Altres Drets de Cathalunya, the section headed Genealogia dels Reys d'Aragó i Comtes de Barcelona speaks of the genealogy of John I of Aragon, son of Peter IV, saying that John and Violant had a son named James, "lo qual intitularen Delphi [Dauphin] de Girona".  On 19 February 1416, Ferdinand I of Aragon, considering the title of duke insufficient, raised it to the rank of Principality of Girona. However, these titles fell into gradual disuse until the 20th century as the heir of the King of Spain became better known by the hereditary title of the Crown of Castile, "Prince of Asturias."

Modern usage
In 1961, when announcing the wedding the future Juan Carlos I of Spain and Sofia of Greece, the Spanish Royal House issued the young prince, as titles of pretense, the style of "Prince of Asturias," "Prince of Girona," and "Prince of Viana" — these three titles referring to his status as heir apparent to the kingdoms of Castile, Aragon and Navarre respectively. He started using the titles of "Prince of Girona" on his passport during the rule of caudillo Franco, to avoid the more contentious title Prince of Asturias which was well known to be reserved for the heir of the throne of Spain. His father had adopted a similar tactic, styling himself Juan, Count of Barcelona; using the title of King of Spain would have been seen as directly subversive of the Francoist state. However, calling himself Count of Barcelona was a clear attempt at asserting his hereditary rights to then defunct Spanish throne, as there had been no Count of Barcelona who was not either King of Aragon or of Spain since the Middle Ages.

When Juan Carlos was finally given an official capacity in the Spanish state as heir to the kingdom by General Franco, he received the title of "Prince of Spain" and thus began to use this until he became King of Spain. On 21 January 1977 his son, Felipe, would be the first to use all of these titles in any official capacity for over 250 years.

With the accession of Felipe to the throne in 2014, his elder daughter Leonor became Princess of Girona, as heiress presumptive to the throne of Aragon. 
The Princess of Girona Foundation was created in 2009 and is now run on behalf of Princess Leonor: it funds programmes to aid young people.

Holders

See also
Count of Girona
Princess of Girona
List of titles and honours of the Heir Apparent to the Spanish Throne

Notes

External links 

Crown of Aragon
History of Catalonia
Aragonese Empire
Girona